Enid Bishop (born 8 May 1925) is an Australian librarian specialising in Asian studies.

Biography
Born in 1925 in Melbourne, Enid Bishop is the daughter of Horace Eddy and Lillian Alice (née McKittrick) Bishop. She attended Huntingtower School in Mt Waverly, Victoria, and later moved to Canberra. Bishop held a number of library assistant positions in her early career, including at Australia House, London, Australian News and Information Bureau Reference Library, New York, and National Library of Australia, Canberra. She was Assistant Librarian in the Asian Collection (then called the Oriental Collection) at Canberra University College from 1958 to 1960. She completed a Bachelor of Arts from that institution in 1960, the same year she was awarded a Fulbright Scholarship. She later attended Columbia University, where she was awarded a Master of Science in 1961.

Bishop was a founding member of the International Association of Orientalist Librarians (IAOL), and also of the East Asian Librarians' Group of Australia (EALRGA; now Asian Library Resources of Australia). Throughout her career she published several scholarly articles, both presented at and organised Australian and national conferences, and played a "crucial role in the development of Asian studies librarianship in Australia".

Enid Bishop became the Divisional Head of the Asian Studies Collection at the Australian National University Library, retiring in 1984 after 22 years at ANU. After retiring, Bishop married and is now known as Enid Gibson.

References/Notes and references

1925 births
Possibly living people
Australian librarians
People from Canberra
Australian women librarians